is a Japanese politician of the Liberal Democratic Party, a member of the House of Representatives in the Diet (national legislature). A native of Kai, Yamanashi and high school graduate, he was elected to the town assembly of the town of Ryūō, Shiga in 1977, serving for three terms, and then to the assembly of Yamanashi Prefecture in 1991, serving for, again, three terms. In April 2003, he was elected to the House of Representatives for the first time as an independent.  He represented the 3rd District of Yamanashi prefecture until 2008.

References

External links 
  in Japanese.

Members of the House of Representatives (Japan)
Mayors of places in Japan
People from Yamanashi Prefecture
Living people
1945 births
Liberal Democratic Party (Japan) politicians